Elachista platysma is a moth of the family Elachistidae. It is found in Australia.

The wingspan is 7.3–9 mm for males and 7.9-8.7 mm for females. The forewings are bluish grey and the hindwings are grey.

References

Moths described in 2011
platysma
Moths of Australia